B. rosea may refer to:

 Bersama rosea, a synonym for Bersama abyssinica
 Burlingtonia rosea, a synonym for Rodriguezia lanceolata

See also
 Rosea (disambiguation)